Rajinder Kumar may refer to:

 Rajinder Kumar (footballer) (born 1993), Indian footballer
 Rajinder Kumar (chemical engineer) (born 1934), Indian chemical engineer
 Rajinder Kumar Dhanger (born 1961), Indian judoka